Grønningen Lighthouse is a coastal lighthouse in the municipality of Kristiansand in Agder county, Norway. The lighthouse was built in 1878 to improve the marking of the shipping lane into Kristiansand harbor. In 1842, the Russian ship-of-the-line Ingermanland had collided with the Grønningen islet, leading to a catastrophe. The current lighthouse sits on Grønningen, a bare islet in the Kristiansandsfjord, and it marks the eastern side of the main shipping channel that leads inland to the port of the city of Kristiansand.

It is attached to one end of a -story lighthouse keeper's house. The light is a 4th order Fresnel lens.
 
The lighthouse was first put into service on 1 September 1878.  The station was staffed until 1980 and in 1994, the entire facility was protected by law as a national monument.  The lighthouse is operated by the Bragdøya kystlag foundation, and it is open to the public. During the summer holiday season, it can be used as a free hostel available for overnight stays.

See also

Lighthouses in Norway
List of lighthouses in Norway

References

External links
 Norsk Fyrhistorisk Forening 

Lighthouses completed in 1878
Lighthouses in Agder
Listed lighthouses in Norway
Buildings and structures in Kristiansand